Sant Mateu (Catalan for Saint Matthew) may refer to:

Sant Mateu, a town and municipality in Castellón, Valencia
Sant Mateu de Bages, a village in the comarca of Bages
Sant Mateu d’Albarca, a small village in the North of the Spanish island of Ibiza

See also
San Mateo (disambiguation)
São Mateus (disambiguation)
Saint-Mathieu (disambiguation)